Charles Leavell Moses (May 2, 1856 – October 10, 1913) was a U.S. Representative from Georgia.

Born near Turin, Georgia, Moses attended small country schools and ultimately graduated from Mercer University, Macon, Georgia, in 1876.  He later engaged in teaching and agricultural pursuits.
For several years he served as principal of the Newnan Academy for Boys.
After 1886, he devoted his time exclusively to agricultural interests, and was also involved in  the Farmers' Alliance.

Moses was elected as a Democrat to the Fifty-second, Fifty-third, and Fifty-fourth Congresses (March 4, 1891 – March 3, 1897).
He served as Chairman of the Committee on Pensions (Fifty-third Congress).
He was unsuccessful in his candidacy for renomination in 1896, after which he resumed his agricultural pursuits in Turin, Georgia.
He served as delegate to several Democratic State and National Conventions.
He served as a member of the Georgia State House of Representatives, from 1900-1904.
He retired and moved to Atlanta, Georgia, where he died October 10, 1913, and was ultimately interred in Oak Hill Cemetery.

References

1856 births
1913 deaths
Democratic Party members of the Georgia House of Representatives
Democratic Party members of the United States House of Representatives from Georgia (U.S. state)
19th-century American politicians